The Lebanese Liberation Front (LLF; Arabic: جبهة التحرير اللبنانية transliterated as Jabhat al-Tahrir al-Lubnaniyya; French: Front de Liberation Libanais, FLL) was an underground terrorist group of nationalist trend formed in February 1987.

Activities 1987-1990
Also designated the Lebanese Liberation Organization (LLO; Arabic: Al-Tanzim al-Tahrir al-Lubnaniyya; French: Organisation de Liberation Libanais, OLL) this mysterious organization appears to have combined a variety of grievances against Syria, Israel and United States policies over Lebanon.  In the late 1980s the LLF/LLO was responsible for a series of guerrilla attacks directed against Syrian Army troops stationed in Lebanese territory and although their only single action carried outside the Middle East was in Canada, their motivations to attack a Canadian target and significance to the group's overall objectives remains unclear.  The Lebanese Liberation Front ceased its guerrilla activities in 1989, though is presumed that it remained active at least until the mid-1990s.

See also 
 Lebanese Civil War
 Lebanese Forces (Militia)
 Guardians of the Cedars
 Popular Revolutionary Resistance Organization
 Liberation Battalion
 Sons of the South

References

Edgar O'Ballance, Civil War in Lebanon, 1975-92, Palgrave Macmillan, London 1998. 
 Rex Brynen, Sanctuary and Survival: the PLO in Lebanon, Boulder: Westview Press, Oxford 1990.  – 
Robert Fisk, Pity the Nation: Lebanon at War, London: Oxford University Press, (3rd ed. 2001).  –

Further reading

 Jean Sarkis, Histoire de la guerre du Liban, Presses Universitaires de France - PUF, Paris 1993.  (in French)
 Samir Kassir, La Guerre du Liban: De la dissension nationale au conflit régional, Éditions Karthala/CERMOC, Paris 1994.  (in French)

Factions in the Lebanese Civil War
Israeli–Lebanese conflict